Frank Moerman (born 12 May 1937) is a Dutch rower. He competed in the men's coxed four event at the 1960 Summer Olympics.

References

1937 births
Living people
Dutch male rowers
Olympic rowers of the Netherlands
Rowers at the 1960 Summer Olympics
Sportspeople from Rotterdam